Warisnagar  Assembly constituency is an assembly constituency in Samastipur district in the Indian state of Bihar.

Overview
As per Delimitation of Parliamentary and Assembly constituencies Order, 2008, No. 132 Warisnagar Assembly constituency is composed of the following: Warisnagar and Khanpur community development blocks; and Madhurapur, Rahtauli, Dahiyar Ranna, Parsa, Bhataura and Dumra Mohan gram panchayats of Shivaji Nagar CD Block.

Warisnagar Assembly constituency is part of No. 23 Samastipur (Lok Sabha constituency).

Election results

2020

2015

1977-2010
In the 2010 state assembly elections, Ashok Kumar of JD(U) won the Warisnagar assembly seat defeating his nearest rival Gajendra Prasad Singh of RJD. In the 2009 by elections, Viswanath Paswan of LJP won. Contests in most years were multi cornered but only winners and runners up are being mentioned. Maheshwar Hazari of LJP defeated Bhikhar Baitha of RJD in October 2005. Maheshwar Hazari of LJP defeated Sanjay Paswan of  RJD in February 2005. Ram Sewak Hazari of JD(U) defeated Bhikhar Baitha of RJD in 2000. Pitambar Paswan of JD defeated Parameswar Ram of Congress in 1995 and 1990. Sewak Hazari, Independent  defeated Shyama Kumari of Congress  in 1985. Pitambar Paswan of Janata Party (SC) defeated Parameshwar Ram of Congress (I) in 1980. Pitambar Paswan of Janata Party defeated Baleshwar Ram of Congress.

References

External links
 

Assembly constituencies of Bihar
Politics of Samastipur district